Venus is a Sirius XM Radio station playing rhythmic pop from the 2000s through today.

Details
Sirius XM initially described the channel as follows:The biggest hits of today, the hottest hits of tomorrow, and the coolest new music.Venus is a Rhythmic Top 40 station with an emphasis on current-based Rhythmic Pop/Dance hits from the 2000s and today with recurrents from the 2000s, all commercial-free. The channel replaces Top 20 on 20, which officially signed off on July 16, 2014 at 12:04 AM after 14 years. The first song to be played on Venus was "My Humps" by The Black Eyed Peas. With the launch of Venus, the move gave Sirius XM two channels with a Rhythmic-focused format, joining The Heat, whose direction favors current-based R&B/Hip-Hop hits.

With the addition of Pitbull's Globalization Radio, which was launched in 2015, Venus shifted to Rhythmic Pop and some Hip Hop from the past two decades, allowing Globalization Radio to take on the current Rhythmic/Dance fare. In July 2018 . Venus was moved to make room for Dave Matthews Band radio a limited run channel showcasing the career of Dave Matthews Band in July 2018 also announced that billboard hot 100 number ones would take over channel 3 and Venus would return in August 5, 2018.

In 2019, with the addition of Pandora Now to channel 3, Venus moved to channel 303.  The playlist primarily spans of rhythmic leaning pop and hip hop hits from the mid-2000s to presents, a formula similar to its sister station The Pulse on channel 15, as well as Hits 1 on channel 2, which plays top 40 pop and rhythmic hits.  Artists commonly heard on Venus include Olivia Rodrigo, Lady Gaga, Post Malone, Dua Lipa, Britney Spears, Chris Brown, and Halsey. On September 30, 2021, at 11:59 PM after playing "Titanium" by David Guetta and Sia, Venus rebranded as Venus303 with a heavy emphasis of hip-hop, R&B, and Pop and urban contemporary Venus began stunning with a loop of what flashing lights by Kanye West, and unstoppable by Sia, and then shifted their stunt to a ticking clock. Venus303 has launched with 10,000 songs in a row without station identification.

Core artists
Rihanna
Lady Gaga
Mariah Carey
Britney Spears
Beyonce
Jennifer Lopez
P!nk
Christina Aguilera
Black Eyed Peas
Mary J. Blige

References

External links
Sirius XM/Venus

Sirius XM Radio channels
Rhythmic contemporary radio stations
Sirius Satellite Radio channels
XM Satellite Radio channels
Radio stations established in 2014